Burt Procter (1901 – July 2, 1980) was an American painter who specialized in depictions of horses and portraits of Native Americans.

Life
Procter was born in 1901 in Boston, Massachusetts. He attended Stanford University.

Procter was a commercial artist in Los Angeles and later in New York. He was the art director of the Pageant of the Masters for 17 years. He painted horses and portraits of Native Americans, but he "refused to be classified as a Western artist."

Procter resided in Corona del Mar with his wife Katherine. They had a daughter, Virginia. Procter died on July 2, 1980, in Palm Springs, California, at age 79. His artwork can be seen at the Nelson Museum of the West in Cheyenne, Wyoming.

References

1901 births
1980 deaths
People from Boston
People from Palm Springs, California
Stanford University alumni
American male painters
American portrait painters
Equine artists
Painters from California
20th-century American painters
20th-century American male artists